Phyllocnistis acmias is a moth of the family Gracillariidae. It is known from New South Wales, Australia.

References

Phyllocnistis
Endemic fauna of Australia